The women's javelin throw event at the 1979 Summer Universiade was held at the Estadio Olimpico Universitario in Mexico City on 9 September 1979.

Results

References

Athletics at the 1979 Summer Universiade
1979